Peter Frederick Wilson (born 15 September 1947) is an Australian former soccer player. He was the captain of the Australian squad at the 1974 World Cup in West Germany. His nickname is Big Willie and his position was sweeper.

Biography
Often regarded as one of the toughest defenders in the modern era, Wilson was a dominating figure in the Australian team in the 1970s. Born in Felling, England in 1947, Wilson migrated to Australia in 1969 to join South Coast United after failing to break into the first team for English club Middlesbrough. He started his career as full back but injury to another player switched him to sweeper where he had his biggest success.

Between 1970–79, he made a then-record 116 appearances for the national team, and captained Australia from 1971, including the 1974 FIFA World Cup finals. When he signed with Sydney club Western Suburbs, Wilson travelled 257 kilometres four times a week for training. He also played with Marconi and APIA Leichhardt and in later years coached South Coast and APIA.

Peter Wilson is now living as a recluse near Wollongong in New South Wales. After not speaking publicly for more than two decades, an Australian newspaper tracked him down and reported that he was living in a small town south of Sydney. "There's nothing I want to say," he said. "I've got nothing to add."

His last match for Australia was a home friendly against Partizan Belgrade on 29 June 1979. The match ended a 1–1 draw.

Internationals and achievements
 A-Internationals: 65 (4 November 1970 – 13 June 1979)
 60 games as captain, 3 goals
 116 games for Australian (incl. Test games 133)
 14 games for New South Wales (6 as captain)
 Friendship Cup tournament in Vietnam 1970
 Asia/Oceania Champion 1973
 1974 FIFA World Cup Australian captain

References

External links
 Englisch Peter Wilson – The Southern Cross

1947 births
Living people
Footballers from Gateshead
English emigrants to Australia
English footballers
Australian soccer players
Australia international soccer players
Australian expatriate sportspeople in England
1974 FIFA World Cup players
Middlesbrough F.C. players
Gateshead F.C. players
Balgownie Rangers FC players
Marconi Stallions FC players
Association football defenders
People from Felling
Sport Australia Hall of Fame inductees